Manon Barbe is a city councillor from Montreal, Quebec, Canada. She has served as the borough mayor of LaSalle since 2003. She was a member of the Union Montreal municipal political party.

Barbe was first elected as a city councillor in 1995. She chairs the Regional Conference of Elected Officials and is also the chair of the city's standing committee on cultural development and quality of life.

References

External links
LaSalle Borough Council (pages 5 & 7)

21st-century Canadian politicians
21st-century Canadian women politicians
Montreal city councillors
Living people
Mayors of places in Quebec
Women mayors of places in Quebec
People from LaSalle, Quebec
Women municipal councillors in Canada
Year of birth missing (living people)